Eugene Black may refer to:

Eugene Black (Texas politician) (1879–1975), American politician, former Congressman
Eugene Robert Black (1873–1934), American attorney and businessman, former Federal Reserve Chairman
Eugene R. Black Sr. (1898–1992), American banker, former president of the World Bank and son of Eugene Robert Black
Eugene F. Black (1903–1990), American lawyer and judge, former Michigan Attorney General and former member of the Michigan Supreme Court
Eugene H. Black III (born c. 1964), U. S. Navy officer